Fatty is a derogatory term for someone who is obese. It may refer also to:

People

 Mai Fatty, Gambian politician
 Roscoe Arbuckle (1887–1933), American actor and comedian
 Fatty Briody (1858–1903), American Major League Baseball player
 Fatty D (April Fores), American pornographic actress
 Bob Fothergill (1897–1938), American Major League Baseball outfielder
 William Foulke (footballer) (1874–1916), English cricketer and footballer
 Fatty George (1927–1982), Austrian jazz musician
 Richard Lamb (1907–1974), Australian racing cyclist
 Fatty Lawrence (1903–1976), college gridiron football player
 W. T. McLain (1885–1938), college gridiron football player, lawyer, and politician
 Charles H. Smith (American football), University of Michigan football player in 1893–1894
 Roland Taylor (1946–2017), retired American Basketball Association and National Basketball Association player
 Paul Vautin (born 1959), Australian former rugby league footballer and coach, television presenter and commentator
 Thomas Walsh (mobster) (died 1929), New York City mobster
 Fatty Warren (1898–1946), college football player

Fictional characters
 the title character of Fatty Finn, a long-running Australian comic strip
 Fatty Fudge, in "Minnie the Minx" in the UK's The Beano comic
 Frederick "Fatty" Brown, in "The Bash Street Kids" in the UK's The Beano comic
 Frederick Algernon Trotteville, in Enid Blyton's Five Find-Outers series of mystery novels
 one of the title characters of Fatty and George, a 1981 Australian children's television series

See also
 Mike "Prince Fatty" Pelanconi, British sound engineer and record producer
 
 Fat (disambiguation)
 Fats (disambiguation), including a list of people with the nickname
 Skinny (disambiguation)

Lists of people by nickname